The Eddie Graham Memorial Show was an annual professional wrestling event held in 1987 and 1988 as a tribute to wrestler Eddie Graham. The first show was held by Championship Wrestling from Florida in 1987, shortly before it merged with Jim Crockett Promotions, and by Mike Graham under the Florida Championship Wrestling banner the following year. The latter show was much larger than the previous one and held as an interpromotional supercard including the American Wrestling Association and World Class Championship Wrestling, most notably, featuring a "champion vs. champion" match between WCCW Heavyweight Champion Kerry von Erich and AWA World Heavyweight Champion Jerry "The King" Lawler in the main event.

Show results

First Annual Eddie Graham Memorial Show
May 9, 1987 in St. Petersburg, Florida (Bayfront Center)

Second Annual Eddie Graham Memorial Show
July 30, 1988 in Tampa, Florida (Expo Hall)

References

External links
NWA Eddie Graham Memorial at CageMatch.de 

Professional wrestling memorial shows
1987 in professional wrestling
1988 in professional wrestling
Championship Wrestling from Florida
1987 in Florida
1988 in Florida
Professional wrestling shows in Tampa, Florida
Professional wrestling in St. Petersburg, Florida